The Boodles Tennis Challenge (former Boodle and Dunthorne Champions Challenge) is an international five-day tennis exhibition held at Stoke Park in Buckinghamshire, England. In coordination with Boodles, a luxury jeweler, it was initially founded by veteran sports agent Patricio Apey as an event to help players hone their grass court skills in the lead-up to Wimbledon. It is played in a similar style to the AAMI Classic giving the players at least three matches each and allowing non competition players to appear in one match per a day. Over recent years Andre Agassi, Pete Sampras, Tim Henman, Marat Safin, James Blake, Andy Roddick, Fernando González, David Nalbandian, Novak Djokovic, Fernando Verdasco, Jo-Wilfried Tsonga and Andy Murray have all appeared. Since its inception, the Boodles has turned into a lifestyle event featuring British luxury brands such as Boodles, Veuve Clicquot and H.R. Owen.

Attendances are strictly limited to 1,900 people per day to ensure every guest has a view of both the tennis and the jewelry on display.

The tournament was cancelled in 2020 and 2021 because of the COVID-19 pandemic in the United Kingdom. The tournament was also cancelled in 2022 due to renovations at Stoke Park. It is set to return on 20 June 2023.

Winners by year

History

2015 event

Matches and results

2015 players
Singles
 Novak Djokovic (1–1), Rafael Nadal (1–0), Kevin Anderson (0–1), John Isner (1–1), Richard Gasquet (0–1), Tommy Robredo (2–1), Fabio Fognini (0–2), Jack Sock (1–1), Philipp Kohlschreiber (2–0), Lukáš Rosol (1–1), Fernando Verdasco (2–1), Alexander Zverev (1–0), Lucas Pouille (0–2), Janko Tipsarević (1–0), Robin Haase (1–3), Nicolás Almagro (1–1), Dušan Lajović (0–1), Thanasi Kokkinakis (0–1), Radek Štěpánek (1–0)
Did not play
 Milos Raonic, Jerzy Janowicz
Boys singles
 Taylor Fritz (1–0), Stefanos Tsitsipas (0–1)
Legends singles
 Goran Ivanišević, Cédric Pioline
Doubles
 Bryan brothers (1–0), Zverev brothers (0–1)

References

External links

 Official website

 
Tennis tournaments in England
Exhibition tennis tournaments
Recurring sporting events established in 2002
2002 establishments in England
Sport in Buckinghamshire